St Sebastian is one of several paintings of Saint Sebastian by Perugino. It shows him three-quarter length and is signed "P[I]E[T]RUS PERUSINUS PINXIT" (Peter of Perugia painted [this]) on the arrow in his neck. It was painted in 1493–1494. It is now in the Hermitage Museum in St Petersburg.

References

Paintings by Pietro Perugino
1494 paintings
Paintings in the collection of the Hermitage Museum
Perugino
Torture in art